Bangs Independent School District is a public school district based in Bangs, Texas (USA).
The district is located in western Brown County and extends into a small portion of Coleman County.

Finances
As of the 2010–2011 school year, the appraised valuation of property in the district was $274,804,000. The maintenance tax rate was $0.104 and the bond tax rate was $0.017 per $100 of appraised valuation.

Academic achievement
In 2011, the school district was rated "academically acceptable" by the Texas Education Agency.

Schools
As of the 2011–2012 school year, the district had four schools.

Regular instructional
Bangs High School (Grades 9-12)
Bangs Middle School (Grades 5-8)
J.B. Stevens Elementary (Grades PK-4)

Alternative instruction
Early Special Program (Grades PK-12)

See also

List of school districts in Texas

References

External links

School districts in Brown County, Texas
School districts in Coleman County, Texas